Phase 5(Sector 59) is a residential area of Mohali, Punjab.

Restaurants 
Maihaan Punjabi Cuisine Restaurant.
The Brew Master
Khalsa Vaishno Dhabha
Barbeque Nation
Yo!China
Domino's Pizza
Pizza Hut
Mr Rooster
Punjabi Haveli
Republic of Chicken
Cafe Coffee Day

Banks 

Axis Bank
Punjab and Sind Bank
Bank of Baroda

References

Sahibzada Ajit Singh Nagar district
Sectors of Mohali